The Sunbelt Baseball League (SBL) is a non-profit collegiate summer baseball league with teams located in metropolitan Atlanta, Georgia, Columbus and Oxford, Alabama. The SBL is a member of the National Alliance of College Summer Baseball, which is partially funded by Major League Baseball. Games are played with wooden bats and showcase some of the top talent in the nation while providing family entertainment to the community. The season starts in early June and runs through the end of July/early August, with playoffs determining the league champion. The mission of the Sunbelt Baseball League is to provide a first-class collegiate summer program dedicated to helping young college athletes achieve their dreams of playing at the professional level.

Current league teams

Past champions and runners-up

Former league teams
 
 Gainesville Braves (2020-2021) became G'ville Gol'Diggers
 Marietta Patriots (2018-2021) became Atlanta Blues
 Gwinnett Tides (2014-2019) became Gainesville Braves
 Norcross Astros (2016-2019) became Gwinnett Astros
 Phenix City Crawdads (2014-2017)
 Carrollton Clippers (2016-2017)
 Alpharetta Braves (2015-2017) became Alpharetta Aviators
 Sunbelt Patriots (2017) became Marietta Patriots
 Marietta Patriots (2016) became Sunbelt Patriots
 Douglasville Bulls (2009-2015) became Carrollton Clippers
 East Cobb Patriots (2014-2015) became Marietta Patriots
 Home Plate Chukars (2010-2014) became Peachtree City Chukars (2015)
 Windward Braves (2010-2014) became Alpharetta Braves
 Berkeley Lake Tides (2009-2013) became Gwinnett Tides
 6-4-3 DP Cougars (2011-2013)
 OTC Bearcats (2012-2013)
 Rockdale Roadrunners (2011)
 South Atlanta Bearcats (2011)
 Rockdale A's (2005-2010)
 Signature Park Grizzlies (2010)
 South Atlanta Phillies (2010)
 Atlanta Astros (2005-2010)
 Fulton Grizzlies (2009)
 Alpharetta Phillies (2009)
 Johns Creek Wood Ducks (2005-2009)

Sunbelt Baseball League alumni in Major League Baseball

References

External links
Sunbelt Baseball League
National Alliance of College Summer Baseball
Atlanta Blues
Atlanta Crackers
Alpharetta Aviators
Brookhaven Bucks
Choccolocco Monsters
Columbus Chatt-A-Hoots
Gainesville Gol'Diggers
Gwinnett Astros
Waleska Wild Things

2009 establishments in the United States
College baseball leagues in the United States
Sports leagues established in 2009
Summer baseball leagues